Ignatios Kallergis (Larissa, 1892 – 1964) was an officer of the Greek Army. He reached the rank of major general, participating in the Balkan Wars, the Allied intervention in Southern Russia and the Asia Minor Campaign. He played an important role in Greek Armed Forces in the Middle East. He took part in nine crucial battles and was honored with almost every Greek medal for valour. He married Elpida Karimali and had two children, Elizabeth and Konstantinos (Professor of Medicine, Aristotle University of Thessaloniki).

References 

1892 births
1964 deaths
Hellenic Army major generals
Greek military personnel of the Balkan Wars
Greek military personnel of the Greco-Turkish War (1919–1922)
Greek military personnel of the Russian Civil War
Greek military personnel of World War I
Greek military personnel of World War II
Ignatios
Military personnel from Larissa